Tristachyideae is a tribe of the Panicoideae subfamily in the grasses (Poaceae), native to tropical and subtropical regions of Africa, Asia, and South America. There are around 70 species in eight genera. The tribe belongs to a basal lineage within the subfamily, and its genera were previously placed in tribes Arundinelleae or Paniceae, subfamily Arundinoideae, or the now-obsolete subfamily Centothecoideae. Species in this tribe use the C4 photosynthetic pathway.

Genera
Danthoniopsis
Dilophotriche
Gilgiochloa
Loudetia
Loudetiopsis
Trichopteryx
Tristachya
Zonotriche

References

External links

Panicoideae
Poaceae tribes